The Lindens is a historic home located near Bryantown, Charles County, Maryland. It is a two-story frame house built during the second quarter of the 19th century in the Federal style.  It is in the double parlor plan with Greek Revival mantels and an exterior double chimney.  It overlooks the lower fields of the farm and the Zekiah Swamp.

It was listed on the National Register of Historic Places in 1990. The letters "JFG" are found carved into the chimney with the date 1840. The house sits on His Lordships Place and is privately owned.

References

External links
, including photo from 1978, at Maryland Historical Trust

Houses in Charles County, Maryland
Houses on the National Register of Historic Places in Maryland
Federal architecture in Maryland
Houses completed in 1840
National Register of Historic Places in Charles County, Maryland